Fawzia Abbas Fahim (born December 9, 1931, in Al-Fayoum, Egypt) is an Egyptian biochemist and environmental biologist known for her work on the anti-tumoral effects of snake venom and iodoacetate. She is currently Professor of Biochemistry at Ain Shams University, Egypt. Fahim has also made important contributions to infant and occupational health, and pollution issues in Egypt.

Fahim worked as a Demonstrator in the Faculty of Engineering, Department of Chemistry at Cairo University, from 1957 to 1962. She received a governmental grant from the United Kingdom, October 1962 – June, 1965, where she attended Birmingham University. In 1966 she served as a lecturer in the Department of Biochemistry at Ain Shams University. In 1975 Fahim became an associate professor and in 1980 she became a full professor, the position she still holds.

Fahim was head of the Department of Biology and Natural Sciences, Institute of Environmental Studies and Research, at Ain Shams University from 1983 to 1989.

Fahim received her B.Sc. from Cairo University, Egypt, in 1954 and her Master of Science in chemistry from Cairo University in 1962. In 1965 she got her Ph.D. from Birmingham University, England. She is the author, or co-author, of over 80 scientific papers.

Personal life
In 1959 Fahim married Salah El-Din Mohamed El-Mahdi, a professor of Design and Theory of Machines at the Faculty of Engineering, Ain-Shams University. He died in 1998. They had  3 children.

References
 Personal Interviews, November 2008 and March 2009.

Selected publications

1931 births
Egyptian scientists
Living people
Alumni of the University of Birmingham
Cairo University alumni
Academic staff of Cairo University
Academic staff of Ain Shams University
Egyptian writers
People from Faiyum Governorate